Douglas Williams (born October 1, 1962) is a former American professional football player who was an offensive lineman in the National Football League (NFL) and the World League of American Football (WLAF). He played for the Houston Oilers of the NFL, and the San Antonio Riders of the WLAF. Williams played collegiately at Texas A&M University.

Personal life
Married Carolyn Crisp Williams, 2 daughters Cassady Williams, Riley Williams.

References

1962 births
Living people
American football offensive guards
American football offensive tackles
Houston Oilers players
San Antonio Riders players
Players of American football from Cincinnati
Texas A&M Aggies football players